Khayal Nazim oglu Najafov (born 19 December 1997) is an Azerbaijani professional footballer who plays as a midfielder for Sumgayit in the Azerbaijan Premier League.

Career

Club
On 22 May 2015, Najafov made his debut in the Azerbaijan Premier League for Sumgayit match against Khazar Lankaran.

National team
He made his debut for Azerbaijan national football team on 14 November 2020 in a Nations League game against Montenegro. He substituted Tellur Mutallimov in the 81st minute.

References

External links
 

1997 births
Living people
Association football midfielders
Azerbaijani footballers
Azerbaijan international footballers
Azerbaijan under-21 international footballers
Azerbaijan youth international footballers
Azerbaijan Premier League players
Sumgayit FK players
People from Sumgait
21st-century Azerbaijani people